Longing was to have been Dusty Springfield's second LP for the ABC Dunhill Records label, and ninth studio album overall, recorded in 1974 and planned for release the same year. Most of the Longing recordings were mixed and released much later on the compilations Simply Dusty (2000) and Beautiful Soul: The ABC Dunhill Collection (2001).

Longing was recorded in Blauvelt, New York and produced by Brooks Arthur, best known for his work as a sound engineer for Phil Spector and Bert Berns through most of the 1960s and later as a composer and producer in his own right for among others Neil Diamond, Bette Midler, Van Morrison and Janis Ian. Elements was the working title of the album but it was re-titled and advertised as Longing in the music press near the end of 1974 and had at that stage also officially been given a catalogue number: DSD-50186. Springfield complained in interviews later in the seventies that some producers of her previous album, Cameo, had not even asked: "what key I wanted to sing in". Not used to being so uninvolved in her own work (owing partly to her own reported perfectionist tendencies), suffering from self-esteem issues due to her rapidly declining career, and enduring problems with substance abuse, Springfield abandoned the Longing album altogether late in the year.

The only track from the Longing sessions to be given an official release in the 1970s was "I Am Your Child", though only the instrumental track (featuring the song's writer, Barry Manilow) was used. Springfield recorded new lead vocals over the original backing track and the song was released as the B-side of her 1977 US single "Let Me Love You Once Before You Go" on the United Artists label. In 1980 the re-recorded version was in turn issued as the B-side of the Philips Records UK single "Your Love Still Brings Me to My Knees" and "I Am Your Child" subsequently found its way onto the compilation album Love Songs released by Phonogram in Europe in the late 1980s. The song is also of special significance in the history of Manilow's own career as he claims it is the first song he ever wrote.

When Springfield, after a time in her life often described as her 'wilderness years', returned to the music scene for the recording of the 1978 album It Begins Again with fellow Briton Roy Thomas Baker she re-recorded two further tracks originally included in the Longing set; the Motown classic "A Love Like Yours (Don't Come Knocking Everyday)" and Chi Coltrane's "Turn Me Around", both with slightly updated and different arrangements.

The year 2000 saw the debut of three original recordings from the Longing sessions; Janis Ian's "In the Winter", Melissa Manchester and Carole Bayer Sager's  "Home to Myself" and Colin Blunstone and David Jones' "Exclusively for Me", all of which had been mixed and digitally remastered as early as 1995. These three titles were finally released as part of Mercury/Universal Music UK's 4 CD boxed set Simply Dusty, a project which was commissioned with Springfield's full approval before her death in 1999.

In 2001 Universal Music's American sublabel Hip-O Records released the compilation Beautiful Soul: The ABC Dunhill Collection which besides the 1973 album Cameo also contained nine of the ten titles intended to be used on Longing, including the original versions of "I Am Your Child", "A Love Like Yours (Don't Come Knocking Every Day)" and "Turn Me Around". In addition, some of the tracks used incomplete or 'practice' vocals, done to enable a release of the album in any form; the track "Corner of the Sky" being the best example. Springfield completed some vocals on the track, but never sang a whole verse. Thus, it was the only track not included in the Beautiful Soul set as it was too incomplete to arrange any sort of commercial release. It was however completed and released in 2007 after fellow British singer Petula Clark added her own vocals and released the song as a duet on her album Duets.

As was the case with many of Springfield's albums released and/or recorded in the '70s, Longing, though unreleased, contained some of Springfield's most critically acclaimed work. The track "In the Winter", written and also recorded by Janis Ian, is often singled out from the recording sessions as an example. Ian said that after hearing Springfield sing the song she (Ian) could "no longer do the piece justice" herself. Melissa Manchester has also been quoted as saying she was "over the moon" upon hearing Springfield sing "Home to Myself" during the recording session, on which Manchester also played the piano.

Track listing

Personnel and production
 Dusty Springfield – vocals, background vocals
 Brooks Arthur – record producer, audio engineer
 Larry Alexander – assistant engineer
 Ron Frangiapane – musical arranger, keyboards
 Garry Sherman – arranger, keyboards
 Renee Armand – background vocals
 Gail Kantor – background vocals
 Merle Miller – background vocals
 Judy Thomas- background vocals
 Christie Thompson – background vocals
 Maretha Stewart – background vocals
 Rita – background vocals
 Steve Gadd - drums
 Gary Chester – drums
 Jimmy Johnson – drums
 Bernard "Pretty" Purdie – drums
 Barry Lazarowitz – drums
 Ralph MacDonald – percussion
 Joe Venuto – percussion
 Al Gorgoni – guitar
 Cornell Dupree – guitar
 Hugh McCracken – guitar
 David Snyder – guitar
 John Tropea – guitar
 Russell George – bass guitar
 Gordon Edwards – bass
 Stephen Schwartz – keyboards
 Frank Owens – keyboards
 Joe d'Elia – keyboards
 Richard Tee – keyboards
 Paul Griffin – keyboards
 Melissa Manchester – keyboards, background vocals, liner notes (Beautiful Soul: The ABC Dunhill Collection)
 Barry Manilow – keyboards, liner notes (Beautiful Soul: The ABC Dunhill Collection)
 Artie Kaplan – music contractor
 Ben Mitchell – digital remastering, mixing (Simply Dusty)
 Paul Howes – digital remastering, mixing (Simply Dusty)
 Tony Heester – digital remastering, mixing (Simply Dusty)
 Janis Ian – liner notes (Simply Dusty)
 Kevin Reeves – mixing (Beautiful Soul: The ABC Dunhill Collection)
 Dan Hersch – digital remastering (Beautiful Soul: The ABC Dunhill Collection)
 Jim Pierson – liner notes, compilation producer (Beautiful Soul: The ABC Dunhill Collection)
 Pat Lawrence – executive producer (Beautiful Soul: The ABC Dunhill Collection)
 Michele Horie – project coordinator (Beautiful Soul: The ABC Dunhill Collection)
 Dana Smart – project coordinator (Beautiful Soul: The ABC Dunhill Collection)

References

Sources
 Howes, Paul (2001). The Complete Dusty Springfield. London: Reynolds & Hearn Ltd. .
 Liner notes: Janis Ian. Simply Dusty, Mercury Records/Universal Music 546,730-2, 2000.
 Liner notes: Barry Manilow & Melissa Manchester. Beautiful Soul: The ABC Dunhill Collection, Hip-O Records/Universal Music 088,113,477-2, 2001.

Dusty Springfield albums
Unreleased albums
Albums produced by Brooks Arthur